Te Puna Roimata Peak is a peak (c.890 m) located 1.5 nautical miles (2.8 km) west of Terra Nova Glacier and 2 nautical miles (3.7 km) south of Lewis Bay on the lower northeast slope of Mount Erebus, Ross Island. On November 28, 1979, a New Zealand DC10 aircraft on a scenic flight from Auckland crashed near this peak claiming the lives of 237 passengers from eight countries and a crew of 20. In 1987, a stainless steel memorial cross was erected west of the peak. Te Puna Roimata Peak (meaning spring of tears) was named by the New Zealand Geographic Board (NZGB) in 2000.

Mountains of Ross Island